The following is a list of transfers related to the 2019 Canadian Premier League season. All transfers made during, or prior to the 2019 season are included here.

Transfers

All clubs without a flag are members of the Canadian Premier League.

Notes

References

Specific

2019
Transfers
Canadian Premier League
Canadian Premier League